On September 15, 2003 XGI Technology Inc introduced the Volari V5.  The V5 is a video card and was available with an Accelerated Graphics Port (AGP) 8x interface in Taiwan.  It is similar in terms of clock speed to the Radeon 9600 Pro and the GeForce FX 5600.

References

XGI Volari - Newest GPU on the Block
http://www.pcstats.com/articleview.cfm?articleid=908&page=1

XGI Volari Performance Figures Emerge 
http://www.theinquirer.net/?article=11609

Graphics cards